Kirsten Bolm (born 4 March 1975 in Frechen, West Germany) is a retired German hurdler.

Bolm's personal best is 12.59 seconds, achieved in July 2005 in the Crystal Palace Grand Prix at the Crystal Palace National Sports Centre.

She graduated in psychology from the University of Heidelberg in 2009.

Achievements

External links

 Official Website

1975 births
Living people
People from Frechen
Sportspeople from Cologne (region)
German female hurdlers
Olympic athletes of Germany
Athletes (track and field) at the 2004 Summer Olympics
Heidelberg University alumni
European Athletics Championships medalists
Universiade medalists in athletics (track and field)
Universiade bronze medalists for Germany